Hydatostega viridiflos is a species of long-legged fly in the family Dolichopodidae.

Subspecies
There are three known subspecies of H. viridiflos:
Hydatostega viridiflos fulvidorsum (Van Duzee, 1925)
Hydatostega viridiflos gratiosa (Aldrich, 1911)
Hydatostega viridiflos viridiflos (Walker, 1852)

According to BugGuide, H. v. viridflos is found along the coast of Northeast North America, while the other subspecies are found in Western North America.

References

Hydrophorinae
Articles created by Qbugbot
Insects described in 1852
Taxa named by Francis Walker (entomologist)
Diptera of North America